The Paulista Derby (or Derby Paulista in Portuguese), is an Association football match between traditional São Paulo football clubs Sport Club Corinthians Paulista and Sociedade Esportiva Palmeiras. It is the rivalry between two of the oldest football clubs still active in the city of São Paulo. The Paulista Derby is ranked among the ten greatest derbies in the world.

It is one of the biggest rivalries in world football: CNN considers it the ninth largest classic in the world, the second in the Americas and the only one in Brazil to be among the main world rivalries. The Football Derbies website has placed The Paulista Derby as the 4th biggest rivalry in the world (and the first in Brazil), now ranked 8th in its world ranking, while the Brazilian magazine Trivela ranked it as the second largest in Brazil. Corinthians and Palmeiras have already decided state (Campeonato Paulista), regional (Torneio Rio-São Paulo) and national (Campeonato Brasileiro) championships, plus a Copa Libertadores semi-finals and quarter-finals. No other Brazilian football rivalry has this many major trophies involved.

The rivalry between fans of the two clubs is also the biggest among the big fans in the state of São Paulo. Datafolha survey in 2010 showed that 59% of Corinthians fans consider Palmeiras as the biggest rival. For 77% of the fans in the city, the biggest rival is Corinthians. In February 2017, a Datafolha survey released by the Folha de S. Paulo newspaper showed that the majority of the population in the city of São Paulo continued to consider the classic between Corinthians and Palmeiras as the one with the greatest rivalry in São Paulo. According to the survey, carried out between February 8 and 9, 2017, 35% of respondents rated Derby as the biggest rivalry in the State of São Paulo.

Beginning of rivalry - 1910s and 1920s

In the first confrontation between Palestra Itália and Corinthians, on May 6, 1917, there was a palestrine victory by 3 to 0, with three goals by striker Caetano. Twice champion by the Paulista Football League, in 1914 and in 1916, Corinthians had been unbeaten in 25 games for three years. That afternoon, at the Palestra Itália Stadium, he fell before the then newcomer Palestra, who would be, from that day, his greatest rival in history.

The third match between the two teams was played in 1918, on March 17. On the day of the game, the players of Palestra Itália passed in front of a pension where the Corinthians athletes had lunch. The first took an ox bone, wrote the message "Corinthians is chicken soup for Palestra" and shot in the cafeteria. In the game, Palestra came to be winning twice, but gave up the tie, by 3 to 3. Since then Corinthians keeps the bone in their trophy room. The first white victory over Palestra was 3-0, on May 3, 1919, with goals from Américo, Garcia and Roverso, in a match played at Estádio da Floresta.

In 1921, Corinthians, Palestra Itália and Paulistano, at the time the most winning team of the season, fought for the Paulista Championship title until the final rounds. In the last round, however, only Corinthians and Paulistano had chances for a title. Paulistano beat Sírio 3 to 2, reached 39 points and took the lead in the competition. It remained for Corinthians, with 38 points, to face Palestra, with 36 points, in a period of football in which the victory was worth two points. If he won, therefore, the team at Parque São Jorge would be the champion. On Christmas Day, Palestra and Corinthians played a duel at Parque Antarctica, still shy and recently bought by the team of the Italian colony, which defeated Corinthians 3-0 and gave the title to Paulistano. For many, as of that game, the rivalry between 'alviverdes' and 'alvinegros' had definitely consolidated and would last forever.

In 1929, when the Paulista Championship was organized by two different entities, Corinthians was champion by APEA, the most traditional of them. In the last round of the first single round, the alvinegro took advantage of the fact that the palestrinos play only with ten - Heitor was injured, to score by 4 to 1. The victory, by the running points championship, was worth the title of the competition, which had Santos as runner-up.

In 1933, on November 5, Palestra Itália applied the greatest rout in the history of the classic, in a match played at the Palestra Itália Stadium, which was valid simultaneously for the Paulista Championship and the Rio-São Paulo Tournament of that year. With four goals by Romeu Pellicciari, one by Gabardo and three by Imparato, alviverde applied a resounding 8-0 at alvinegro, in the biggest defeat suffered by Corinthians in all its history. The impact of the thrashing on the Parque São Jorge team was so great that it overthrew the then president of the club, Alfredo Schurig and made the Corinthians fans set fire to the headquarters of the association itself.
At the 1936 São Paulo Championship, Corinthians and Palestra Itália made their first title decision in three electrifying matches, as the alvinegro had won the first round unbeaten and alviverde had won the second round. The three games were played between April and May 1937. In the first match, at the Palestra Itália Stadium, Palestra Itália won 1-0, with Alvinegro leaving the field on the 31st minute of the second half, complaining of a goalkeeper foul in the move of the goal. In the second game, at Parque São Jorge, the teams drew 0-0. In the third game, at the Palestra Itália Stadium, Palestra won the final 2-1 and won the title.

In 1938, the history of Derby Paulista included an unusual fact that involved São Paulo FC and also the Portuguesa. In early July of that year, just after the 1938 World Cup, a financial crisis forced the tricolor team to create a quadrangular tournament, called the Mündell Júnior Cup, in order to raise money to solve part of the problems. On the occasion, Corinthians and Palmeiras played a match, which was historically known as the “Jogo das Barricas”. The duel ended in a 0-0 draw and featured the black and white of Parque São Jorge classified for the final by the highest number of corners. In the final, against Portuguesa, who eliminated São Paulo, Corinthians won the title. After the tournament, the tricolor team rose in the following months and was runner-up in the Paulista Championship of the same year, also won by the Corinthians.
In 1938, the Paulista Championship was paralyzed in April for the World Cup that year. As a way to keep the State teams active in an official competition, APEA created the II Extra Paulista Championship of 1938. And in the final, the decision was between Palestra Itália and Corinthians. In the first game of the final, on the 21st of August, there was a 0-0 draw. In the last and decisive match, on the 18th of September, Palestra Itália won 2-1, winning two times this type of competition, since it had its first triumph in 1926.

Rivalry in the 1940s

In 1940, the city of São Paulo saw the inauguration of the Pacaembu Stadium and the first trophy achievement of the place was achieved during a Derby. Participated in the City of São Paulo (National) Cup, Palestra Itália, Corinthians, Atlético Mineiro, And Coritiba. After winning their semifinals, on May 5 of that year, Palestra Itália and Corinthians made another final. With a 2-1 victory over Corinthians, Palestra Itália was the first Pacaembu champion.
In the period of greatest turmoil in the history of Palmeiras, during the Second World War, when Palestra Itália was forced to change its name by the laws of the Vargas Dictatorship against associations that made references to the countries of the Axis, Corinthians was largely victorious. During the transition from Palestra Itália to Palmeiras, the club adopted, from March to September 1942, the name of Palestra de São Paulo. In the meantime, he played four times against Corinthians. In the first match with that provisional name, by the way, he was beaten by the alvinegro by 4 to 1, on March 28, by the Quinela de Ouro Tournament. Almost two months later, on May 27, Corinthians thrashed by the same score, for the Manoel Domingos Corrêa Cup. For the 1942 Paulista Championship, Palestra was undefeated and, on June 28, maintained his condition by drawing 1-1 with Corinthians in the first round. Days later, on July 15, for the City Cup of São Paulo, Corinthians again thrashed the Palestra de São Paulo, this time by 4-2.

After Palmeiras, in their first game with this denomination, to win the title of the 1942 São Paulo Championship, against São Paulo, in the episode that became known as Arrancada Heroica, the team met Corinthians in the last round of the competition, which was disputed by running stitches. In revenge for what Palestra Itália had done to alvinegro the previous year, Corinthians prevented alviverde from being undefeated champion, with a 3-1 victory, on October 4, in the first Derby between the teams with the new archrival name.
Palmeiras' first victory under the new name over Corinthians would come only in 1943, on May 23, for the First Round of the 1943 Paulista Championship. In a match held at the Pacaembu Stadium, alviverde beat alvinegro 2-0, with two goals from midfielder Lima, for an audience of 63,344 people.

In 1945, the arch-rivals came together for a political cause. In a historic match held at the Pacaembu Stadium, Corinthians and Palmeiras played a classic that aimed to raise funds for the Brazilian Communist Party (PCB). The game ended with a 3-1 win by alviverde and was portrayed years later in the book "Palmeiras x Corinthians 1945: O Jogo Vermelho", written by politician Aldo Rebelo.
On April 25, 1948, Derby Paulista had its second biggest rout in the entire history of the classic. In a match held at the Pacaembu Stadium, for the City Cup of São Paulo, Palmeiras defeated Corinthians 6-0, on the scoreboard that only loses to the 8-0 of 1933, still at the time of Palestra Itália.

The Paulista Derby in the second half of the 20th century

The 1951 Rio-São Paulo Tournament marked the second highlight of the outstanding championship between the two associations. The Palmeiras team, which would win the five crowns, made the Rio-SP tournament that year one of them. The first final game took place on April 8 and ended with the score of 3 to 2 for the emeralds. In the second and decisive match, which took place on April 11, Palmeiras won at Pacaembu playing for a paying audience of 54,465 spectators and with 2 goals by Jair Rosa Pinto and one by Aquiles. The final result was 3 to 1, as Luizinho discounted for Corinthians.

On January 18, 1953, Derby had its most scoring game in history. In the classic valid for the Paulista Championship, Corinthians defeated Palmeiras 6-4 at the Pacaembu Stadium. For the alvinegro, Cláudio scored three goals and Baltazar two, in the game in which the team of Parque São Jorge more stuffed the networks of the biggest rival.

On February 6, 1955, an important game in the history of the derby was held at the Pacaembu Stadium, as the match was worth the title of the 1954 Paulista Football Championship and was part of the celebrations of the fourth centenary of the city of São Paulo, which was founded in 1554. The draw was enough for Corinthians to win the title. For Palmeiras, it was necessary to defeat the rival and hope for a new blackout setback in the last round, against São Paulo. The alvinegro did what he needed, coming out ahead, with a goal from Luizinho in the first half, at ten minutes. After Palmeiras, dressed in blue shirts, equalized the score with a Nei goal, seven minutes into the second half, the alvinegro held the tie by 1 to 1 and celebrated the important achievement. After this title, Corinthians would only become São Paulo champion again 22 years later, in 1977.

In the first round of the 1971 Paulista Championship, on April 25, Corinthians and Palmeiras played one of the greatest games in the history of the classic. The alvinegro, with many charges because of the taboo, was bad in the championship and would face Palmeiras de Leão, Luís Pereira, Dudu and Ademir da Guia at Estádio do Morumbi. Alviverde scored 2-0 with goals from César Maluco in the first half. In the second half of the game, Corinthians returned ready to end the party alviverde and managed to draw, with goals from Mirandinha, in the 5th minute, and Adãozinho, in the 24th. Palmeiras played a minute later, with a goal from the midfielder Leivinha, but Corinthians' Tião equalized again after 27 minutes. In the 43rd minute, Mirandinha broke the tie for Alvinegro, closing the scoring in a historic 4-3 and celebrating one of the biggest victories over his biggest rival.

The change from the 1954 São Paulo decision would be quite painful for the Corinthians fans, since on December 22, 1974, Palmeiras defeated Alvinegro by 1 to 0 in the final of the São Paulo Championship that year. Corinthians had been without winning the state title for twenty years and, even counting stars like Rivelino, Vaguinho and Zé Maria, and also the overwhelming majority of the 120,522 fans who overcrowded Morumbi, the Alvinegra team was defeated by the squad alviverde commanded by Dudu and Ademir da Guia, with Osvaldo Brandão as coach. The palmeirense victory was declared by the goal of striker Ronaldo, in the 24th minute of the second half. At the end of the game, the minority of just over ten thousand palmeirense fans in the stadium started the cry "Zum, zum, zum, it's 21", in reference to another year that would be added to Corinthians' 20 without titles.

In the 1979 Paulista Championship, Palmeiras was led by coach Telê Santana and was being named as the favorite for the title due to the good campaign in the first phase of the competition. A backstage maneuver by then-president of Corinthians, Vicente Matheus, played the semifinal that brought Derby to January 1980. During the first phase of the championship, he used a right that ended up interrupting the championship for 4 months. The Corinthians president refused to play the match against Ponte Preta, in the first phase, as a double round was scheduled, and Matheus said that Corinthians would end up harmed in the income division (as happened in the years of 77 and 78, according to the regulation, in the classification criteria, the collection obtained by the clubs was also considered together with the score in the two previous rounds). In fact, the double round was not foreseen and the championship stopped, making the intervention maneuver a strategy to paralyze the championship and cool the biggest rival that was packed. Thus, without the same momentum as the end of 1979, Palmeiras conceded the 1-1 draw to the alvinegro of Parque São Jorge in the 40th minute of the second half in the first game. In the second match, played on January 30, a cinnamon goal by Biro-Biro, gave Corinthians victory and elimination alviverde, paving the way for the black and white team title in that competition.

The derby in the 1980s and 1990s

In 1982, the height of the palmeirense title taboo and the height of the Corinthians Democracy, Corinthians applied its biggest defeat over Palmeiras. In a match valid for the Paulista Championship, the alvinegro won by 5 to 1, with three goals and a show by the then newcomer Casagrande, one from the midfielder Sócrates and another from the midfielder Biro-Biro. With a highly technical team, alvinegro followed well in the competition and reached the title, after beating São Paulo in the finals. Alviverde was third in the championship.

In 1983, one of the semifinals of the Paulista Championship that year featured Derby. In two very disputed games, Corinthians and Palmeiras honored the tradition of the classic. In the first match, the score was 1 to 1 and the highlight was the mark imposed by alviverde on Socrates. In charge of this task, the defender Márcio Alcântara did not detach from the Corinthians player at any moment, but, after leaving behind on the scoreboard, the alvinegro team drew at 31 minutes of the second half, with a penalty goal exactly by Sócrates. In the second match, also played at the Morumbi Stadium, Palmeiras repeated the tactic of trying to annul the midfielder, but, already scalded, the player managed to move more easily and, in an individual play, scored the winning goal by 1 to 0 The scoreboard eliminated Palmeiras and secured Corinthians in another final, in which the Parque São Jorge team would reach the second championship, again on top of São Paulo.

In 1986, despite still remaining without titles, the palmeirense had two joys in games against Corinthians, both for the Paulista Championship that year. The first one took place in the second round of the championship, with the return of the 5-1 defeat by Corinthians in 1982. The second took place in the semifinals of Paulistão. After a first game full of refereeing errors, Corinthians won the match by 1 to 0, with a goal by Cristóvão. Palmeiras gave change in the second game, with a 3-0 victory, with a great display by striker Mirandinha, who scored, in normal time, the goal was alive in the 42nd minute of the second half, and, in overtime, the second goal of Palm trees. The 3-0 win ended with an Olympic goal from midfielder Éder.

In the 1989 Brazilian Championship, Palmeiras reached the last round needing the victory to go to the final of the competition. Already eliminated, Corinthians was the indigestible opponent in the match played on December 10, 1989, since, with a great goal from forward striker Cláudio Adão, with his heel, he prevented the archrival, 13 years without title, from making the final against o São Paulo.

On June 12, 1993, another decision that involved an extensive taboo, of 16 years, only that of Palmeiras. Commanded by coach Vanderlei Luxemburgo, alviverde ended the title fast, winning the final of the Paulista Championship against Corinthians 4-0 (3-0 in normal time and 1-0 in overtime), with goals scored by Zinho, Evair (2) and Edílson. According to the competition rules, Palmeiras, who had done the best campaign in the championship, needed to win the second game of the final to take the decision for extra time, since Corinthians won the first game 1-0, with a goal marked by Viola, who imitated a pig, provoking the crowd and the cast alviverde. Palmeiras opened the scoring of the second game in the first half, when after a pass from center forward Evair, midfielder Zinho hit a right leg kick. In the second half, Mazinho played on the left and crossed for Evair to enlarge. Soon after, Daniel Frasson crossed from the left to Evair, who kicked on the crossbar, but Edílson scored on the left. With this score, alviverde was playing for a draw in overtime, but Evair scored from the penalty spot the title goal and the break of the taboo.

Still in 1993, at the Rio-SP Tournament, Palmeiras won another final against Corinthians. In the first game, the devil Edmundo scored two goals and secured the victory in the first game, in Pacaembu by 2 to 0. The goals actually ended up deciding the title, since in the final game, a 0-0 draw took the cup to the Palestra Italia.

National League and Copa Libertadores decisions

At the end of 1994, Palmeiras and Corinthians made yet another decision, this time the most important of the national derby. The teams from São Paulo reached the final of the Campeonato Brasileiro Série A 1994 that year in two games that were played at the Pacaembu Stadium. In the first match, played on December 15, Alviverde defeated Alvinegro 3-1, with a great display by midfielder Rivaldo, who scored two of the three goals from Palmeiras. With the opening of a great advantage over the archrival, Palmeiras entered quietly in the second match and won their eighth title of the Brazilian League on December 18 with a 1-1 draw against Corinthians.

In 1995 Corinthians returned to give back at Palmeiras in a decision, after failures in the previous two years. The teams reached the finals of the Paulista Championship that year, and the two decisive matches were played in Ribeirão Preto, at the Santa Cruz Stadium. The first game ended with a 1-1 draw, with Palmeiras reaching equality in the 48th minute of the second half with a goal from forward Nílson. In the second match, the same Nílson opened the scoring for alviverde, but midfielder Marcelinho Carioca drew in a beautiful free kick. In overtime, midfielder Elivelton defined the score from 2 to 1 and sealed the title of Corinthians Paulista who, for the first time in his history, leaves the field with a victory in an official title decision against Palmeiras.

In the quarterfinals of the Copa Libertadores 1999, Palmeiras eliminated the archrival. Both matches were held at the Morumbi Stadium and ended with a score of 2: 0: in the first, on May 5, the victory came from Palmeiras, after a real bombing by Corinthians to goal alviverde, but with great performance by the goalkeeper Marcos, who came to be called "São Marcos" by the fans; in the second match, on May 12, Corinthians won. With that, the decision went to penalties, with the green and white team winning 4-2, with another great performance by Marcos, who saw Corinthians striker Dinei kick on the crossbar and who defended one of the penalties of the dispute, charged by the half Vampeta.
A month after the confrontation at Libertadores, Palmeiras and Corinthians returned to a decision, now, in the 1999 Campeonato Paulista final. In the first game, played on June 13, alviverde spared the titleholders, as he would have, three days later, the decision against Colombia's Deportivo Cali for the Copa Libertadores final. The alvinegro took advantage of the situation and won the match by 3 to 0. In the second game, played on June 20, days after Palmeiras won the Libertadores, the rivalry, which is historically immense, was on edge. Marcelinho Carioca opened the scoring, but Evair, with two goals, turned the game, tied by Edílson, in the 28th minute of the second half. With the title practically guaranteed, Edílson provoked the Palmeiras team by making "embassies" and juggling the ball. Winger Júnior and striker Paulo Nunes did not like the provocation and went for the Corinthians, triggering a general fight on the field. Judge Paulo César de Oliveira ended the match before normal time and Corinthians was again champion of São Paulo.

In the following year, the two great rivals would return to meet in the Copa Libertadores 2000, only in the semifinal phase. The duel, won again on penalties by Palmeiras, also brought as ingredients the fact that he defended the 1999 continental title and Corinthians won, in the beginning of 2000, the first FIFA Club World Championship Championship. The new clashes, which took place at the Morumbi Stadium, were also seen as a form of Corinthians rematch over their arch rivals, in relation to the knockout stage of the previous year. In the first match of the 2000 Libertadores semifinals, Corinthians beat Palmeiras 4-3. After opening the scoring with a goal by midfielder Ricardinho and allowing the team to tie the game in 3 to 3, alvinegro decided the game in the final minutes, with a goal from the wheel Vampeta. The decisive match, played on June 6, had high doses of emotion, since it had two turns of score. Palmeiras opened the scoring with a goal by striker Euller. Corinthians reached the first turn with two goals from Luizão. Palmeiras turned the game again and set the score at 3-2, with goals from Alex and Galeano. With the equality of goal difference, the classification for the next phase between the two teams was, for the second consecutive year, defined in the penalty kicks. Palmeiras eliminated Corinthians, as they converted the five free kicks, while the opponent wasted the last indirect free kick, after goalkeeper Marcos defended the collection of Corinthians idol Marcelinho Carioca, in one of the most striking moments in the history of the competition and the São Paulo derby .

The São Paulo derby today

In 2011, Palmeiras and Corinthians played a very tense game in the semifinals of the Paulista Championship. With controversial arbitration by judge Paulo César de Oliveira, alviverde played most of the match with one player less, as defender Danilo was sent off for a violent cart over the forward Corinthians Liédson. Despite the adversity and also the expulsion of coach Luis Felipe Scolari, Palmeiras dominated the match and scored the first goal, in the 7th minute of the second half, with defender Leandro Amaro. Corinthians, in turn, tied the game on 19 minutes, with a goal by striker William. The dispute was in a single game and, as it ended in a draw, the decision went to penalties. In the collections, Corinthians goalkeeper Júlio César defended the sixth collection, from the player from the city of João Vítor, and the Peruvian Ramirez hit the free kick, classifying the team in the championship finals and breaking a Corinthians taboo, who had never eliminated the archrival through penalty kicks.

In the same year, in December, the archrivals met again in a decisive game. Palmeiras had no chance of winning a title and was already qualified for the 2012 Copa Sudamericana, but Corinthians was playing the game that could bring their fifth conquest of the Brazilian Championship, played in the system of running points. The alvinegra team was the leader of the competition and needed only a tie to get the title, while Vasco, placed second in the table, needed to root for Palmeiras' victory and defeat their arch rival Flamengo at Estádio Nilton Santos to be champion. At Estádio do Pacaembu, Corinthians and Palmeiras played a tense game, with two expulsions on each side, but without goals, while Vasco and Flamengo drew 1-1 in Rio de Janeiro. At the end of both games, Corinthians won the 2011 Brazilian Championship. Palmeiras ranked eleventh in the championship. Vasco, in turn, took the vice-championship and Flamengo was in the fourth position of the table.

In 2014, on July 27, Corinthians and Palmeiras faced each other again, this time at the new stadium of the Alvinegro, Arena Corinthians, for the first round of the Brazilian Championship. With goals from Paolo Guerrero and Petros, the home team defeated the team alviverde by 2 to 0 in the first Derby Paulista played in the arena.

The following year, on February 8, 2015, it was Derby's turn to be held at Allianz Parque, a new Palmeiras arena, built where the former Palestra Itália Stadium was. In the week leading up to the duel for the first phase of the 2015 Campeonato Paulista, due to the fear of violence among rival organized fans, the Public Ministry tried to impose its will to play the game with the only home crowd, a wish that was also of the president. from Palmeiras, Paulo Nobre, but who did not have the support of the fans of both teams. After the president of Corinthians, Mario Gobbi, threatened not to play the match, the São Paulo Football Federation went back and allocated the load of tickets to the alvinegro. In the game, unlike Corinthians, alviverde failed to win the first Derby in the remodeled arena. He lost 1-0, with a goal by midfielder Danilo, in a match also marked by the expulsion of goalkeeper Cássio Ramos, from Corinthians, by wax.
Palmeirense revenge came months later, in the same Paulista Championship, for the semifinal of the competition. In a match played at Arena Corinthians on April 19, 2015, the teams drew in normal time by the score of 2 to 2: Palmeiras came out ahead with a goal from Victor Ramos, took the turn with goals from Danilo and Mendoza, but drew with Rafael Marques. The championship regulations provided for a single game at the home of the team with the best campaign, the unbeaten white-black. But, if there was a tie, the decision would go to penalties. In the charges, striker alviverde Robinho kicked the ball out, but Elias and Petros, from Corinthians, had the charges saved by goalkeeper Fernando Prass. The victory of the visiting team on penalties by 6 to 5, in the middle of the arena in Itaquera, represented the first elimination of Corinthians in their new home in an official competition, precisely for the historic archrival, who qualified for the final of the competition, against Santos.

A little more than a month after eliminating Corinthians in the Paulista Championship, Palmeiras got the better of their rivals, this time with a victory in normal time, at Corinthians Arena, by 2 to 0, for the first round of the 2015 Brazilian Championship. It was alviverde's first victory at the home of Alvinegra and the first defeat of Corinthians in classics in their arena. The match, which was played on May 31 and had goals scored by Rafael Marques and Zé Roberto, also made Palmeiras break a fast of victories over the archrival that lasted since August 2011.
2015 was an important year to reinvigorate rivalry and, in the second round of the Brazilian Championship, it was no different than what was seen in the first half. On September 6, in a match played at Allianz Parque, Palmeiras and Corinthians made a classic defined by the press as “electrifying”. In the game, alviverde came out in front of the marker with a goal scored by Lucas, in the 18th minute of the first half, but the alvinegro drew in the 24th, with Guilherme Arana. In the sequence, at 26, Palmeiras returned to tie with a goal scored by midfielder Robinho. Corinthians arrived at 2 to 2, at 37, with a goal against the midfielder alviverde Amaral, but the arch-rival made 3 to 2 still, in the first half, at 41, with a goal scored by Dudu. In the final stage, alvinegro started a draw after 33 minutes, setting the score in 3 to 3, in one of the best games of the 2015 Brasileirão.

Palmeiras' first victory at Allianz Parque over the biggest rival happened on June 12, 2016, when they defeated Corinthians 1-0 in a game valid for the 2016 Brazilian Championship. The goal of the game was scored at 2 minutes of the second half by midfielder Cleiton Xavier. In this Derby Paulista, it was also the first time that the classic was played with a unique crowd. At the time, the palmeirense arena had its public record broken. There were 39,935 payers for an income of R $2,763,659.36.
2017 is the year that marks the centenary of Derby Paulista and counts on the union of teams in promoting the classic, with several marketing actions together. In the first classic of the year, played at Arena Corinthians, alvinegro took the best, defeating alviverde by 1 to 0. The game was marked by an arbitration error by judge Thiago Duarte Peixoto, who expelled midfielder Gabriel by mistake. Corinthians, instead of warning the player alvinegro Maycon in a move with forward Keno, from Palmeiras, at the end of the first half. At a numerical disadvantage, Corinthians was cornered by the rival for most of the second half, but reached the goal of the heroic victory in the 43rd minute of the second half with a goal from striker Jô, leading the crowd to delirium. In the second match that marked the centenary year, Corinthians defeated Palmeiras once again, this time 2-0 and at Allianz Parque, for the first round of the 2017 Brazilian Championship, with goals from Jadson and Guilherme Arana. As in 2016, when Palmeiras had won the three games of the year in the classic, Corinthians closed the treble of victories over the biggest rival in the second round of the Brazilian Championship, in a game played on November 5. With goals from Romero, in an unmarked impediment, Balbuena and Jô, the black-and-white guy defeated the alviverde by 3 to 2, which he scored with Mina and Moisés, in a game that set the record for the most club appearances in the Corinthians Arena.

In 2018, after 19 years, Corinthians and Palmeiras again decided on a championship final, in this case, that of the 2018 Paulista Championship. In the first match, played at Arena Corinthians, in a highly disputed game, Palmeiras won 1 to 0 , with a goal by striker Miguel Borja, breaking a sequence of four consecutive Corinthians victories in the previous four Derby matches. In the second game held at Allianz Parque, Corinthians made the change, winning 1-0 in normal time, with a goal by Rodriguinho. With the result, the decision went to penalties, with another victory by Alvinegra, this time by 4 to 3. Thus, Corinthians won its twenty-ninth São Paulo title in the middle of the home. The very final at Allianz Parque was also marked by the controversial arbitration of judge Marcelo Aparecido Ribeiro de Souza, who canceled a penalty (non-existent) penalty against Palmeiras striker Dudu, in the second half of the match. At the time, the game was paralyzed for 8 minutes, with turmoil provoked by players from both teams, who were not satisfied, sometimes with the mark (in the case of Corinthians) and sometimes with the mark (in the case of palmeirenses). With the referee back, the game went to normal time with the score 1 to 0 for Corinthians. After the title of the alvinegra team confirmed with the victory on penalties, Palmeiras reported the breach with the São Paulo Football Federation, claiming that the judge's decision was changed by external interference, a procedure not authorized by FIFA, and conditioning the end of the breach with the adoption of more transparent practices by the entity in relation to arbitration, such as the implementation of the video referee. The Palmeirense revolt with arbitration and the loss of the title to the biggest rival also hit the crowd, with the destruction of equipment and subway trains at Barra Funda Station, made by members of 'torcidas organizadas' (hooligans).

In 2020, during the COVID-19 pandemic, Palmeiras beat arch-rival Corinthians in a historic final of the Campeonato Paulista. In the first decision in the history of the competition and among teams without an audience at the stadium, Palmeiras won after beating Corinthians in the penalty shootout.

Statistics

General
375 matches
129 Corinthians wins
113 draws
133 Palmeiras wins
Goals scored by Corinthians: 491
Goals scored by Palmeiras: 537
Latest match: Corinthians 0–1 Palmeiras (Campeonato Brasileiro - 13 August 2022)

Source: Palmeiras records

Campeonato Brasileiro (1959–Present)
65 matches
19 Corinthians wins
23 draws
24 Palmeiras wins
Goals scored by Corinthians: 61
Goals scored by Palmeiras: 84
Latest match: Palmeiras 3-0 Corinthians (Campeonato Brasileiro - 23 April 2022)

Copa Libertadores
6 matches
3 wins - Corinthians
0 draws
3 wins - Palmeiras
Corinthians goals: 10 (1.67 per match)
Palmeiras goals: 10 (1.67 per match)
Latest match: Palmeiras 3–2 Corinthians (Copa Libertadores semi-finals - 2nd leg - 6 June 2000)

Other
Most goals in a single match: 10 goals
 Palmeiras 4–6 Corinthians (Campeonato Paulista - 18 January 1953) - Pacaembu Stadium, São Paulo

Titles comparison

Greatest wins

Players

Top goalscorers

Most appearances
 Ademir da Guia – Palmeiras: 57 matches

Largest invincibility
Palmeiras – 12 matches (From 4 May 1930 to 5 August 1934 and 15 February 2006 to 18 February 2010)
Corinthians – 10 matches (From 6 July 1952 to 21 July 1954)

Largest attendances
All matches played at Morumbi Stadium.
 Palmeiras 1–0 Corinthians, 120,522 (12 December 1974)
 Palmeiras 4–0 Corinthians, 104,401 (12 June 1993)
 Corinthians 1–0 Palmeiras, 102,939 (31 August 1997)
 Corinthians 0–2 Palmeiras, 102,187 (16 April 1989)
 Corinthians 1–0 Palmeiras, 95,784 (8 December 1983)
 Corinthians 1–0 Palmeiras, 95,759 (24 August 1986)
 Corinthians 3–0 Palmeiras, 94,872 (11 November 1978)
 Corinthians 0–0 Palmeiras, 94,852 (18 February 1979)
 Corinthians 1–0 Palmeiras, 93,736 (6 June 1983)
 Palmeiras 3–0 Corinthians, 92,982 (27 August 1986)

League matches
These are only the league matches since 1971, club name in bold indicate win. The score is given at full-time (T), in the goals columns the goalscorer and time when goal was scored is noted.

References

Sources 
 Classic is Classic... and Vice-Versa
 Stories of Derby Paulista
Futpédia 

Brazilian football derbies
Sport Club Corinthians Paulista
Sociedade Esportiva Palmeiras